The Conversation is a network of not-for-profit media outlets publishing news stories and research reports online, with accompanying expert opinion and analysis. Articles are written by academics and researchers under a Creative Commons license, allowing reuse without modification. Copyright terms for images are generally listed in the image caption and attribution. Its model has been described as explanatory journalism. Except in "exceptional circumstances", it only publishes articles by "academics employed by, or otherwise formally connected to, accredited institutions, including universities and accredited research bodies".

The website was launched in Australia in March 2011. The network has since expanded globally with a variety of local editions originating from around the world. In September 2019, The Conversation reported a monthly online audience of 10.7 million users, and a combined reach of 40 million people when including republication. The site employed over 150 full-time staff as of 2020.

Each regional or national edition of The Conversation is an independent not-for-profit or charity funded by various sources such as partnered universities and university systems, governments and other grant awarding bodies, corporate partners, and reader donations.

History

Launch
The Conversation was co-founded by Andrew Jaspan and Jack Rejtman, and launched in Australia in March 2011.

Jaspan first discussed the concept of The Conversation in 2009 with Glyn Davis, vice-chancellor at the University of Melbourne. Jaspan wrote a report for the university's communications department on the university's engagement with the public, envisioning the university as "a giant newsroom", with academics and researchers collaboratively providing expert, informed content that engaged with the news cycle and major current affairs issues. This vision became the blueprint for The Conversation.

Jaspan and Rejtman were provided support by Melbourne University in mid-2009 which allowed time to incubate the business model. By February 2010 they had developed their model, branding and business identity which they launched to potential support partners by way of an Information Memorandum in February 2010.

The founders secured $10m in funding from four universities (Melbourne, Monash, Australian National University, University of Western Australia), CSIRO, the Victorian State Government, the Australian Federal Government, and the Commonwealth Bank of Australia. The Conversation Media Group opened its Carlton office in November 2010 with a small team, and launched to the public in March 2011.

Departure of Andrew Jaspan 
In March 2017, Andrew Jaspan resigned as executive director and editor, six months after being placed on enforced leave after complaints from senior staff in Melbourne about his management style and the global direction of the group. Management of the UK, U.S., and Africa offices also wrote a letter of no confidence to the Conversation Media Group asking that Jaspan not have an active role in the future.

Content 

Articles are written by academic researchers in their respective areas of expertise. They either pitch topics or are specifically commissioned to write on a topic in which they are a subject-matter expert, including for articles about current events. The Conversation core staff then edits these articles, ensuring a balance between reader accessibility and academic rigour. Editors that work for the site frequently have past experience working for traditional news outlets. The original authors then review the edited version. Topics include politics, society, health, science, and the environment. Authors are required to disclose conflicts of interest. All articles are published under a Creative Commons Attribution/No derivatives licence.

Fact checking 
The site often publishes fact-checks that are produced by academics from major universities, then blind peer reviewed by another academic who comments on the accuracy of the fact check.

In 2016, the FactCheck unit of The Conversation became accredited by the International Fact-Checking Network, an alliance of fact-checkers hosted at the Poynter Institute in the U.S. The assessment criteria require non-partisanship, fairness, transparency of funding, sources, and methods, and a commitment to open and honest corrections.

Technology
The Conversation uses a custom publishing and content management system built in Ruby on Rails. This system enables authors and editors to collaborate on articles in real time. Articles link to author profiles—including disclosure statements—and personal dashboards showing authors' engagement with the public. This is intended to encourage authors for the site to become more familiar with social media and their audience.

International editions

Each edition of The Conversation has a unique content set, editor-in-chief and board of advisors. From its first Melbourne-headquartered Australian edition, The Conversation has expanded to a global network of eight editions, operating in multiple languages.

This has included expansions into the United Kingdom in 2013, United States in 2014, Africa and France in 2015, Canada, Indonesia and New Zealand in 2017, and Spain in 2018. The website also has an international staff.

As of 2018, 36% of its readership was in Australia, 29% was in the United States, 7% in the United Kingdom, 4% in Canada, and 24% elsewhere.

Across the whole network, stories commissioned by The Conversation are now republished in 90 countries, in 23 languages, and read more than 40m times a month.

The Conversation Africa 
The Conversation launched an African edition in May 2015. It launched in Johannesburg. Within its first year, it was endorsed by 21 African universities and had 240 academics contribute to the project. It has offices in Kenya, Senegal, Nigeria, South Africa, and Ghana. As of 2021, most of the authors that published content in The Conversation Africa were affiliated with South African universities, and the website's content initially focused on South Africa. The Bill & Melinda Gates Foundation provided $3m funding.

The Conversation Canada 
The Canadian edition of The Conversation was co-founded on 26 June 2017 by Alfred Hermida and Mary Lynn Young, associate professors in the field of journalism at the University of British Columbia. Launch funding was partly provided in the form of a $200,000 grant from the Social Sciences and Humanities Research Council. The project was joined by Universities Canada as a strategic sponsor, and it partnered with a number of Canadian universities such as the University of Toronto. The founding editor of The Conversation Canada is Scott White, the former editor-in-chief of The Canadian Press. A French-language Canadian edition, La Conversation Canada, launched in 2018.

The Conversation France 
A French edition of the website launched in September 2015. It is based in Paris, France.  was the editor of the French edition at launch. It launched with Fabrice Rousselot as its publication director. He previously worked for Libération. It received initial backing from French academic institutions, including the University of Lorraine, France's Conference of University Presidents, Paris Sciences et Lettres University, and the Institut Universitaire de France. It began with a budget of €1 million.

The Conversation UK
Andrew Jaspan secured seed funding to develop the case to launch The Conversation into the UK in 2012. It launched in the UK on 16 May 2013 with Jonathan Hyams as chief executive, Stephen Khan as editor and Max Landry as chief operating officer, alongside co-founder, Andrew Jaspan. It had 13 founder members, including City, University of London. City's president, Professor Sir Paul Curran chaired its board of trustees. Landry took over from Hyams as chief executive shortly after launch.

By February 2014, the site had attained additional funding from academic research institutions including Research Councils UK and SAGE Publishing. They then hired six additional editors and expanded the UK edition's topical coverage. By August 2014, the UK branch published articles written by a total of almost 3,000 academics. Membership grew to more than 80 universities in the UK and Europe, including Cambridge, Oxford, and Trinity College Dublin. By 2019 it had published 24,000 articles written by 14,000 academics. In April 2018, it appointed former BBC and AP executive Chris Waiting as its new CEO. The Conversation UK is 90 per cent funded by partnered universities, with other funding from the Higher Education Funding Council for England and the Wellcome Trust. In 2019, the site became a member of the Independent Monitor for the Press, an independent press regulator.

The Conversation U.S.
Andrew Jaspan was invited in 2012 to bring The Conversation to the United States. Thomas Fiedler, then dean of the School of Communications at Boston University, offered to host The Conversation U.S. and provide space for the first newsroom. With a university base established, he was able to raise the $2.3m launch funding. The U.S. edition of The Conversation was first published on 21 October 2014, initially led by Jaspan as U.S. CEO, Margaret Drain as editor, and Bruce Wilson leading development and university relations. The U.S. pilot was supported by the Howard Hughes Medical Institute, Alfred P. Sloan Foundation, Robert Wood Johnson Foundation, the William and Flora Hewlett Foundation, and four other foundations. Maria Balinska became editor in 2015, before moving to the US-UK Fulbright Commission. She was succeeded by Beth Daley, who became editor and general manager in 2019. The U.S. edition of The Conversation was originally based at Boston University, and that was its first partnered university. It later opened offices in Atlanta and New York. Other partnered institutions include Harvard University and MIT.

Reception 
Articles originally published in The Conversation have received republication on a regular basis by major news outlets. These have included The New York Times, The Guardian, The Washington Post, and CNN. As of 2015, about 80 per cent of the site's readership were of a non-academic background.

The Conversation has been described in Public Understanding of Science as "a blend of scientific communication, public science communication and science journalism, and a convergence of the professional worlds of science and journalism".

See also 

 Academic freedom
 Climate communication
 JSTOR Daily
 Media transparency
 Non-profit journalism
 Open research
 ProPublica
 Science communication
 Quanta Magazine
 Undark Magazine

References

Further reading

External links
 
 ACNC Charity Register entry

2011 establishments in Australia
Australian news websites
Creative Commons-licensed websites
Internet properties established in 2011
Mass media in Melbourne
Organisations based in Melbourne
Non-profit organisations based in Victoria (Australia)